"Foolish Beat" is a song by American singer-songwriter Debbie Gibson, released as the fifth single from her debut album, Out of the Blue (1987), in April 1988. The single topped the US Billboard Hot 100 on June 25, 1988, giving Gibson the record for the youngest person to write, produce, and perform a number-one single entirely on her own, at age 17.

In the United Kingdom, "Foolish Beat" reached number nine on the UK Singles Chart. The song also reached the top five in Canada and Ireland and the top 10 in the Netherlands and Switzerland. The single was released in Japan as the B-side to "Out of the Blue" on Atlantic Japan 10SW-15. In 2010, Gibson re-recorded the song as an extra track for the Deluxe Edition release of the Japan-exclusive album Ms. Vocalist.

Critical reception
Pan-European magazine Music & Media described "Foolish Beat" as "a moody mid-tempo song, self written and self-produced in a classy, sophisticated style. After a few hearings it certainly sticks in your head."

Music video
In the music video for "Foolish Beat", Gibson typecasts herself as a young performer who recently broke up with her boyfriend; although she now regrets jilting him and wants to make amends, he brushes off her efforts to do so. The video ends with him debating about seeing her show having brought a bouquet of flowers for her; he drops the flowers in a trash can deciding that he did not want to get hurt again, then walks off into the distance.

The music video was shot in New York City and directed by Nick Willing, who directed music videos for bands such as Eurythmics, Bob Geldof, Swing Out Sister, and others. Some scenes were shot at South Street Seaport during Saint Patrick's Day in March 1988. The outfit Gibson wore belonged to her elder sister Michele.

Track listings

Charts

Weekly charts

Year-end charts

Release history

Cover versions
 Saho Nozaki recorded a Japanese-language cover of the song titled  in 1988.
 Voices of Extreme recorded a metal cover of the song, with the music video featuring Gibson herself.

References

External links
 

1987 songs
1988 singles
Atlantic Records singles
Billboard Hot 100 number-one singles
Cashbox number-one singles
Debbie Gibson songs
Songs written by Debbie Gibson